Bulgaria Air serves the following destinations for winter and summer seasons as of 2012/2013.

References

Lists of airline destinations